Hish (also spelled Heish or Heesh) is a town in northwestern Syria, administratively part of the Ma'arrat al-Numan District of the Idlib Governorate. According to the Syria Central Bureau of Statistics, Hish had a population of 8,817 in the 2004 census. It is the administrative center of the Hish Subdistrict, which contained 18 localities with a combined population of 41,231 in 2004. Its inhabitants are predominantly Sunni Muslims.

Nearby localities include Kafr Nabl, Hass, Kafr Ruma and Maarrat al-Numan to the north, Babulin and al-Tah to the east, Kafr Sajnah to the west and Khan Shaykhun to the south. Hish was a small hamlet in the 1960s.

References

Bibliography

Populated places in Maarat al-Numan District
Populated places in Jabal Zawiya